Kot Reham Shah is a village in Mandi Bahauddin District, Punjab, Pakistan.

Populated places in Gujrat District